The national anthem of the Kingdom of Saudi Arabia was first officially adopted in 1950 without lyrics. The piece was gifted by the then Egyptian King Farouq when King Abdulaziz made a visit to Egypt. It was then adopted again in 1984 with lyrics written by Ibrāhīm Khafājī. The original composition was by Abdul-Raḥman al-Khaṭīb in 1947, and the brass instrumental version was later arranged by Sirāj Umar.

Overview
In 1947, because Saudi Arabia did not have a national anthem like other neighbouring countries, King Abdulaziz visited Egypt and asked Egyptian composer Abdul-Raḥman al-Khaṭīb to create a national anthem, and thus "Āsh al-Malīk" was created. The melody is based on an Arab fanfare style, and is similar to the national anthems of other Arab states in the area at the time. In 1958, Mohammed Talat wrote the first set of lyrics, which were not often heard, so King Fahd asked poet Ibrāhīm Khafājī in 1984 to come up with a new set of lyrics, which were completed within six months on 29 June 1984. Khafājī's lyrics are the ones that are used officially today. Saudis listened to their anthem for the first time during the celebrations of Eid ul-Fitr in 1984.

"Āsh al-Malīk" is referred to by Saudi Arabians as "The National Anthem", although it is commonly known by its incipit, "Hasten". The lyrics call upon the country to hasten to greatness and raise the flag, glorify God, and asks Him to grant the King of Saudi Arabia long life.

The instrumental version is called "The Royal Salute", which is also the name of the ceremony in which it is played to salute senior members of the royal family as well as diplomatic figures.

Lyrics

Official lyrics

Saud lyrics (1958)

Ibn Saud lyrics (1947)

Notes

References

External links

Saudi Arabia: an-Nasheed al-Waṭaniy – Audio of the national anthem of Saudi Arabia, with information and lyrics (archive link)
The Royal Embassy of Saudi Arabia in Washington, DC has an Audio page that includes the National Anthem in both vocal and instrumental versions.
https://gulfnews.com/world/gulf/saudi/a-history-of-the-saudi-national-anthem-1.2281470

Saudi Arabia
Royal anthems
Saudi Arabian music
National symbols of Saudi Arabia
National anthem compositions in F major
1947 songs